Milena Harito (born 4 October 1966) is an Albanian politician and member of the Socialist Party of Albania.

She is Minister of Innovation and Public Administration between September 2013 and September 2017. She currently represents Albania in the construction of a regional economic zone for six countries of the Western Balkans.

Life 
She graduated in 1989 from the University of Tirana in computer science, and became a research engineer. She left Albania for France in 1991 where she passed a diploma of specialized graduate studies in communication and information technologies in 1993 from Pierre and Marie Curie University. Four years later, she obtained a doctorate.

After her studies, she joined the Centre national d'études des télécommunications (CNET), then various positions with Orange S.A. in France.

She entered politics in Albania in 2012 and in 2013 she was elected to the Parliament of Albania.

Following the parliamentary elections of 23 June 2013, won by the center-left, she was named, on 15 September, the Minister of Innovation and Public Administration in the government of Socialist Prime Minister Edi Rama.

She led out several reforms, such as the recruitment and career of civil servants, one of the conditions of the process of integration into the European Union (EU). A partnership with the National School of Administration (ENA) has helped strengthen the Albanian Academy of Public Administration (ASPA).

In 2016, she passed legislation transforming public service processes and standards by increasing the use of digital tools. This innovative reform has been the subject of international publications. She also led the transition to DTT, the transition from 3G technology to 4G for mobile operators and created support mechanisms for start-ups with the help of the Italian government.

Family 
Milena Harito is married to Isidor Shteto and has two children.

Awards 
 (2017) Knight of the National Order of Merit (France)

References

External links 

21st-century Albanian women politicians
21st-century Albanian politicians
Living people
1966 births
Socialist Party of Albania politicians
University of Tirana alumni
Pierre and Marie Curie University alumni
Members of the Parliament of Albania
Women members of the Parliament of Albania
Innovation ministers of Albania
Government ministers of Albania
Women government ministers of Albania
Knights of the Ordre national du Mérite